View or position (Pali , Sanskrit ) is a central idea in Buddhism. In Buddhist thought, a view is not a simple, abstract collection of propositions, but a charged interpretation of experience which intensely shapes and affects thought, sensation, and action. Having the proper mental attitude toward views is therefore considered an integral part of the Buddhist path, as sometimes correct views need to be put into practice and incorrect views abandoned, and sometimes all views are seen as obstacles to enlightenment.

Positions 

Views are produced by and in turn produce mental conditioning. They are symptoms of conditioning, rather than neutral alternatives individuals can dispassionately choose. The Buddha, according to early texts, having attained the state of unconditioned mind, is said to have "passed beyond the bondage, tie, greed, obsession, acceptance, attachment, and lust of view."

Those who wish to experience nirvana must free themselves from everything binding them to the world, including philosophical and religious doctrines. Right view as the first part of the Noble Eightfold Path leads ultimately not to the holding of correct views, but to a detached form of cognition.

Understanding karma 

The term "right view" ( / ) or "right understanding" is basically about having a correct attitude towards one's social and religious duties. This is explained from the perspective of the system of karma and the cycle of rebirth. Used in an ethical context, it entails that our actions have consequences, that death is not the end, that our actions and beliefs also have consequences after death, and that the Buddha followed and taught a successful path out of this world and the other world (heaven and underworld or hell). Originating in the pre-Buddhist Brahmanical concerns with sacrifice rituals and asceticism, in early texts the Buddha shifts the emphasis to a karmic perspective, which includes the entire religious life. The Buddha further describes such right view as beneficial, because whether these views are true or not, people acting on them (i.e. leading a good life) will be praised by the wise. They will also act in a correct way. If the views do turn out to be true, and there is a next world after death, such people will experience the good karma of what they have done when they were still alive. This is not to say that the Buddha is described as uncertain about right view: he, as well as other accomplished spiritual masters, are depicted as having "seen" these views by themselves as reality. Although devotees may not be able to see these truths for themselves yet, they are expected to develop a "pro-attitude" towards them. Moral right view is not just considered to be adopted, however. Rather, the practitioner endeavors to live following right view, such practice will reflect on the practitioner, and will eventually lead to deeper insight into and wisdom about reality.

According to Indologist Tilmann Vetter, right view came to explicitly include karma and Rebirth, and the importance of the Four Noble Truths, when "insight" became central to Buddhist soteriology. This presentation of right view still plays an essential role in Theravada Buddhism.

Understanding doctrine 
A second meaning of right view is an initial understanding of points of doctrine such as the Four Noble Truths, not-self and Dependent Origination, combined with the intention to accept those teachings and apply them to oneself. Thirdly, a "supramundane" right view is also distinguished, which refers to a more refined, intuitive understanding produced by meditative practice. Thus, a gradual path of self-development is described, in which the meaning of right view gradually develops. In the beginning, right view can only lead to a good rebirth, but at the highest level, right view can help the practitioner to attain to liberation from the cycle of existence.

Buddhist Studies scholar Paul Fuller believes that although there are differences between the different levels of right view, all levels aim for emotional detachment. The wisdom of right view at the moral level leads to see the world without greed, hatred and delusion.

Misunderstanding objects as self is not only seen as a form of wrong view, but also as a manifestation of desire, requiring a change in character.

No views 
The Buddha of the early discourses often refers to the negative effect of attachment to speculative or fixed views, dogmatic opinions, or even correct views if not known to be true by personal verification. In describing the highly diverse intellectual landscape of his day, he is said to have referred to "the wrangling of views, the jungle of views". He assumed an unsympathetic attitude toward speculative and religious thought in general. In a set of poems in the early text Sutta Nipata, the Buddha states that he himself has no viewpoint. According to Steven Collins, these poems distill the style of teaching that was concerned less with the content of views and theories than with the psychological states of those who hold them.

See also 
Identity view (sakkāya-diṭṭhi, a fetter of the mind on the Buddhist path)
Sammādiṭṭhi Sutta (Early Discourse on right view)
Kālāma Sutta (Early Discourse about misguided beliefs)
The Blind Men and the Elephant (metaphor on fighting about opinions)
 Dogma

Notes

References

External links 
Canki Sutta, early discourse on views in Buddhism
Broad View, Boundless Heart, by Ajahn Amaro and Ajahn Pasanno (2001)
 

Buddhist belief and doctrine
Mental factors in Buddhism